Gareth Lloyd Evans (born 2 November 1952 in Newport) is a former Wales international rugby union player. He played club rugby for Newport RFC as either or a wing or a centre. He made his debut for Wales in February 1977 as a replacement for Gerald Davies against France at the Parc des Princes. Later that year he was selected for the 1977 British Lions tour to New Zealand and played on the wing in the last three internationals against the All Blacks. He played two further games for Wales, against France and Australia in 1978.

References

1952 births
Living people
Barbarian F.C. players
British & Irish Lions rugby union players from Wales
Newport RFC players
Rugby union players from Newport, Wales
Wales international rugby union players
Welsh rugby union players
Rugby union centres
People educated at Newport High School